Indiana Theatre may refer to either of the following buildings:
Indiana Theatre (Indianapolis, Indiana), listed on the NRHP in Marion County, Indiana
Indiana Theatre (Terre Haute, Indiana), listed on the NRHP in Vigo County, Indiana